William C. Jaaska (June 22, 1961 – November 9, 2009) was an American comics artist.

Career
Bill Jaaska's first published comics work was a Skywolf story in Airboy #11 (Dec. 1986). He worked with Peter David on The Incredible Hulk. David has commented that Jaaska's art on The Incredible Hulk #380 was crucial to the impact of the story.

Jaaska is best known for his work on The New Titans published by DC Comics. After leaving The New Titans with issue #113 (August 1994), Jaaska's final new work in the comics industry appeared in Turok, Dinosaur Hunter #23 (May 1995) published by Acclaim Comics.

In 2005, Anthem Pictures used Jaaska's Terminator artwork to create The Terminator: Hunters and Killers a unique "Digital Comic DVD".  The product uses art from the original comic books combined with actors reading the dialog, to create a flowing story that does not have actual motion in the traditional sense of animation, but is not static, in that the screen moves across the panels, and focuses on elements considered important by the director.  The end result is a comic that can be watched on a video screen as opposed to being read.

Bill Jaaska died November 9, 2009 in Milwaukee, Wisconsin.

Bibliography

Acclaim Comics
 Turok #23 (1995)

Dark Horse Comics
 The Terminator: Hunters and Killers #1–3 (1992)

DC Comics
 Checkmate #26 (1990)
 The New Titans #100–103, 108–110, 113 (1993–1994)
 Shade, the Changing Man #10 (1991)
 Swamp Thing #104, 110, Annual #6 (1991)
 Who's Who in the DC Universe #15 (1992)

Eclipse Comics
 Airboy #11 (1986)
 Scout #20 (1987)

First Comics
 Jon Sable, Freelance #56 (1988)
 Nexus #31 (1987)
 Sable #1–4, 6–7, 9–10, 13–17, 19 (1988–1989)

Marvel Comics
 The Incredible Hulk vol. 2 #378, 380 (1991)
 Marvel Super-Heroes vol. 2 #4 (1990)
 Nick Fury, Agent of S.H.I.E.L.D. #15 (1990)
 Uncanny X-Men #263, 265 (1990)
 Wolverine #30 (1990)

References

External links
 
 Bill Jaaska at Mike's Amazing World of Comics
 Bill Jaaska at the Unofficial Handbook of Marvel Comics Creators
 Best, Daniel "What Happened To Bill Jaaska?" at 20th Century Danny Boy, March 23, 2010

1961 births
2009 deaths
20th-century American artists
21st-century American artists
American comics artists
DC Comics people
Marvel Comics people